Venetia is a Regency romance novel by Georgette Heyer set in England in 1818.

Plot summary
The beautiful Venetia Lanyon, thanks to a reclusive and over-protective father, grew up in the country, away from the world with only her younger brother Aubrey, bookish and lame, for company. Her peace and quiet is one day disturbed by the rakish Lord Damerel, who arrives to spend time at his ancestral home next to the Lanyons' house. At first, she sensibly keeps away from him, but when Lord Damerel finds an injured Aubrey and not only takes him into his home to recover but also treats him with great kindness and strikes up a friendship with the awkward young man, she revises her first opinion of him and they soon become the best of friends.

When Venetia and Lord Damerel fall in love, however, Damerel is convinced that marriage with him would cause Venetia's social ruin and insists that it would be wrong to inflict this upon her.

When Venetia's older brother's wife and mother-in-law, about whom he had failed to inform the family, descend on the Lanyons, Venetia's domestic situation becomes intolerable and she is invited to stay for a London season with her aunt and uncle as a way to escape the awkwardness and also to find a husband. During this time, she discovers through a chance encounter that the mother she had been led to believe was dead is actually very much alive and had simply left her father for another man when the children were very young. Venetia realises that this is the cause of her relatives' over-protectiveness - they are concerned that she might follow in her mother's footsteps.

Venetia, however, still very much loves Damerel and sets about creating her own happy ending, seeking the help of her disgraced and estranged mother to persuade both her uncle and Damerel that the marriage should take place.

Characters
 Miss Venetia Lanyon - the eponymous heroine, lives at her family seat, Undershaw in Yorkshire, 25
 Mr Aubrey Lanyon - Venetia's scholarly brother, has a diseased hip, studying for a fellowship to Cambridge, 16  
 Sir Conway Lanyon - absent Master of Undershaw, educated at Eton, 22, in the -nth foot
 Sir Francis Lanyon - Venetia's father, reclusive former Master of Undershaw, died of a stroke shortly after Waterloo
 Jasper, Lord Damerel - Master of Elliston Priory, known as 'The Wicked Baron' due to his rakish behaviour, 38
 The Reverend Julius Appersett - the vicar and self-appointed tutor to Aubrey        
 Mr Oswald Denny - 19,  aspirant to Venetia's hand   
 Sir John and Lady Denny - Oswald's parents      
 Miss Clara Denny - Conway's childhood sweetheart        
 Miss Emily Denny - Oswald's younger sister      
 Mr Edward Yardley - Master of Netherfold, aspirant to Venetia's hand, an only child who lives with his mother
 Mrs Priddy - the Lanyon's nurse, an old retainer, bitter rival of the housekeeper   
 Mrs Gurnard - the housekeeper, bitter rival of nurse        
 Ribble - the butler at Undershaw        
 Powick - steward of Undershaw       
 Flurry - Venetia's spaniel      
 Rufus - Aubrey's high-spirited horse        
 Fingle - Aubrey's groom
 Marston - Damerel's Valet           
 Mr & Mrs Imber - servants at the Priory         
 Nidd - Damerel's groom          
 Croyde   - Damerel's bailiff            
 Dr Bentworth - Aubrey's doctor in York          
 Charlotte, Lady Lanyon - Sir Conway's bride         
 Mrs Scorrier     - Charlotte's mother           
 Miss Trostle - Charlotte's dresser          
 Mr Mytchett - lawyer to the Lanyon family and one of Venetia's trustees         
 Maria, Mrs Philip Hendred - Venetia's Aunt, wife of Mr Philip Hendred, has five daughters, Theresa etc, and three sons, at Oxford, Eton, and in the nursery
 Mr Philip Hendred - Venetia's Uncle and principal trustee.  Lives in Cavendish Square       
 Aurelia, Lady Steeple - Sir Francis Lanyon's 'deceased' wife, mother of Venetia, daughter of General Chiltoe            
 Sir Lambert Steeple - a roué and Venetia's stepfather

References

1958 British novels
Novels by Georgette Heyer
British historical novels
English historical novels
Fiction set in 1818
Heinemann (publisher) books
Regency romance novels
British romance novels